Dagmar Freuchen-Gale (June 30, 1907 – March 9, 1991) was a Danish illustrator, writer and editor.

Early life and education
Freuchen-Gale was born Dagmar Cohn in Kongens Lyngby, Denmark, to Hans Cohn and Betty Johanne Neustadt. Her parents were Jewish and were members of Det mosaiske trossamfunn (The Mosaic Religious Society). Freuchen-Gale left Lyngby in 1938 to go to New York.

Career
Freuchen-Gale was an artist and well known as a fashion illustrator, working for magazines such as Vogue and Harper's Bazaar. In April 1947, Freuchen-Gale illustrated the cover of Vogue which presented new couture house Christian Dior. At the end of the 1940s Freuchen-Gale began to teach fashion illustration at the Art Students League, and continuing there for 20 years.

She edited several of her second husband's, explorer and author Peter Freuchen, books. In 1968, she wrote Cookbook of the Seven Seas, title inspired by Freuchen's book, Book of the Seven Seas.

Personal life 
Freuchen-Gale married three times. Her first husband, a Danish man named Muller, was killed during World War II while serving with the American army in the Pacific.

She met her second husband, Peter Freuchen, on December 24, 1944, in New York at the home of some Danish friends. They married in 1945. Freuchen was a  well known Danish author and Arctic explorer. Beginning in 1945, they lived in New York City and maintained a second home in Noank, Connecticut on Chesbro Street, overlooking Long Island Sound. They appeared together in a well known photo by Irving Penn showing Freuchen with a beard in a massive fur coat. Freuchen often travelled for his work during their marriage but is reported to have written home every day and sent a copy of each letter to the Danish Royal Library, to be opened 50 years after his death, in 2007. Freuchen-Gale joined her husband only once in his travels, on an expedition to Iceland, during which she served native meals including pickled whale blubber and seaweed. During their marriage, she became an expert on various cuisines from around the world. After her husband's death, Freuchen-Gale maintained the Noank home until 1963.

Freuchen-Gale's third marriage was to Henry Gale (d. 1969), an attorney from New York, in 1967. She returned to live in Denmark in the early 1970s.

Works
Peter Freuchen's Adventures in the Arctic, Julian Messner, Inc., New York, Copyright 1960. - (Editor)
Peter Freuchen's Book of the Eskimos, Peter Freuchen Estate. Cleveland Ohio, Copyright 1961. - (Editor)
 Erindringer, 1963 - (Editor)
Cookbook of the Seven Seas, 1968 - (Author)

References

External links 
1955 Dior dress for Vogue

1907 births
1991 deaths
People from Kongens Lyngby
20th-century Danish illustrators
Danish women illustrators
20th-century Danish women writers
Danish editors
Danish women editors
Fashion illustrators
Jewish Danish artists
Jewish Danish writers